The Persian Beach Soccer Cup is an international beach soccer tournament which is held in Bushehr, Iran. The invitation-only tournament has been held annually since the inaugural edition in 2017.

Results

Performance by team

Successful teams

Success by confederation

Overall standings
As of 2018

References

Beach soccer competitions
Beach soccer in Iran